Renzo Meynet is an Italian ski mountaineer and mountain guide.

Together with Osvaldo Ronc and Mirko Stangalino, he placed first in the civilian team category in the 1975 Trofeo Mezzalama edition, which was carried out as the first World Championship of Skimountaineering.

Publications 
 Nemo Canetta, Renzo Meynet: Guida allo sci di fondo nelle Alpi., Milano, 1985

External links 
 Photo, on the summit of the Monte Cristallo, together with Roberto Stella and Gianni Junod, June 27, 1969.

References 

Year of birth missing (living people)
Living people
Italian male ski mountaineers
World ski mountaineering champions